is a Japanese politician who is a member of the Liberal Democratic Party and the House of Representatives of the Diet (parliament).

Overviews 

He served Yoshirō Mori as Chief Cabinet Secretary from July 2000 to October 2000. In 2006 he was appointed secretary-general of the party.

His son, Toshinao Nakagawa, would later serve as a Representative and Vice Minister of the Economy, Trade and Industry.

|-

|-

|-

|-

|-

|-

References

1944 births
Living people
Politicians from Tokyo
Keio University alumni
Members of the House of Representatives (Japan)
Government ministers of Japan
Liberal Democratic Party (Japan) politicians
21st-century Japanese politicians